Swansea East by-election may refer to one of three parliamentary by-elections held for the British House of Commons constituency of Swansea East, in South Wales:

1919 Swansea East by-election
1940 Swansea East by-election
1963 Swansea East by-election

See also
Swansea East constituency
List of United Kingdom by-elections